This list of sequenced protist genomes contains all the protist species known to have publicly available complete genome sequences that have been assembled, annotated and published; draft genomes are not  included, nor are organelle only sequences.

Alveolata
Alveolata are a group of protists which includes the Ciliophora, Apicomplexa and Dinoflagellata. Members of this group are of particular interest to science as the cause of serious human and livestock diseases.

Amoebozoa
Amoebozoa are a group of motile amoeboid protists, members of this group move or feed by means of temporary projections, called pseudopods. The best known member of this group is the slime mold, which has been studied for centuries; other members include the Archamoebae, Tubulinea and Flabellinia. Some Amoeboza cause disease.

Chromista
The Chromista are a group of protists that contains the algal phyla Heterokontophyta (stramenopiles), Haptophyta and Cryptophyta. Members of this group are mostly studied for evolutionary interest.

Excavata
Excavata is a group of related free living and symbiotic protists; it includes the Metamonada, Loukozoa, Euglenozoa and Percolozoa. They are researched for their role in human disease.

Opisthokonts, basal 

Opisthokonts are a group of eukaryotes that include both animals and fungi as well as basal groups that are not classified in these groups.  These basal opisthokonts are reasonably categorized as protists and include choanoflagellates, which are the sister or near-sister group of animals.

See also 
List of sequenced bacterial genomes
List of sequenced animal genomes
List of sequenced eukaryotic genomes
List of sequenced fungi genomes
List of sequenced plant genomes
List of sequenced algae genomes

References 

Biology-related lists
Protist